Kokolos (also, Kakalos) is a village and municipality in the Astara Rayon of Azerbaijan.  It has a population of 3,505.

References 

Populated places in Astara District